Royal Aberdeen Golf Club in Aberdeen, Scotland, was founded in 1780 and claims to be the sixth oldest golf club in the world. It was founded as the Society of Golfers at Aberdeen, and became the Aberdeen Golf Club in 1815 subsequently receiving royal patronage in 1903.

Royal Aberdeen is best known for hosting the 2005 Senior British Open, the 2011 Walker Cup, and the 2014 Scottish Open.

History
Aberdeen can be closely linked to the origins of golf, the earliest reference to a golf hole in Scotland was made in local Aberdeen records dating back to 1625. Royal Aberdeen Golf Club was initially set up as The Society of Golfers at Aberdeen in 1780 making it the sixth oldest golf club in the world.

The club continued be known as The Society of Golfers at Aberdeen before forming The Aberdeen Golf Club in 1815. The club continued to play over The Queens Links area of Aberdeen where the original golf hole in 1625 was believed to have been. In 1976 play was expanded over the Kings Links area to the north of the Queens Links. Golf is still played to date on this land at the King's Links Golf Club.

The club moved to its present location at Ballgownie Links on the other side of the River Don estuary in 1888. The course gained its royal patronage from King Edward VII in 1903 and subsequently changed its name to Royal Aberdeen Golf Club.

The course was originally designed by Archie Simpson and Robert Simpson but was later re-bunkered and lengthened to its current layout by James Braid.

Since its expansion Royal Aberdeen has hosted many top golf tournaments both on an amateur and professional level including the Scottish Open, Senior British Open and the Walker Cup.

Balgownie 
The course runs essentially out and back along the North Sea shore. The outward nine (which is acknowledged as one of the finest in links golf anywhere in the world) cuts its way through some wonderful dune formation. The inland nine returns south over the flatter plateau. A traditional old Scottish links, it is well-bunkered with undulating fairways. It has an excellent balance of holes, strong par 4's, tricky par 3's and two classic par 5's, with the 8th (signature hole) protected by nine bunkers. The ever-changing wind, tight-protected greens and a magnificent finish makes Balgownie a test for the very best. It was highly praised by participants in the 2005 Senior British Open.

Quotes 
The eminent golf writer Sam McKinlay was moved to say "There are few courses in these islands with a better, more testing, more picturesque outward nine than Balgownie".

And this from none other than Bernard Darwin "it represented a huge gap in my golfing education not to have played Balgownie until now, much more than a good golf course, a noble links!"

Scorecards
The scorecard of the Balgownie course is as follows (all distances are given in yards)

Source

Silverburn Course
The Silverburn Course is the second course at Royal Aberdeen Golf Course and measures  over a par of 64

Tournaments hosted
During its history Royal Aberdeen has hosted a number of top amateur and professional tournaments, between 1924 and 1980 the club hosted the Scottish Amateur seven times (1924, 1929, 1933, 1948, 1957, 1970, and 1980). Subsequently, the club hosted the Jacques Léglise Trophy for boys' team golf between Great Britain & Ireland and the Continent of Europe with Great Britain & Ireland claiming a 12½ to 11½ victory.

The club was chosen to host the 2005 The Senior British Open Championship, this was the first time the club had hosted a major championship on any golf tour, the tournament was won by Tom Watson with a 4-under par-score of 280 following a play-off against Des Smyth.

The club was also chosen to host the 2011 Walker Cup between Great Britain & Ireland and the United States, with Great Britain & Ireland claiming a 14 to 12 victory.

In 2014 the club hosted the Scottish Open on the European Tour. During the first round of the tournament, Rory McIlroy set a new course record with a 7-under-par 64. The tournament was won by Justin Rose with a total score of 16-under-par.

In 2018 Royal Aberdeen was the host club of the Amateur Championship, in which Jovan Rebula of South Africa defeated Robin Dawson of Ireland in the finals, 3&2.

See also
List of golf clubs granted Royal status

References

External links

Royal Aberdeen Video

1780 establishments in Scotland
Golf clubs and courses in Aberdeenshire
Sports venues in Aberdeen
Aberdeen
Walker Cup venues
Sports clubs established in the 1780s
Royal golf clubs